Barwałd Dolny is a village in the administrative district of Gmina Wadowice, within Wadowice County, Lesser Poland Voivodeship, in southern Poland.

The village has a population of 699.

References

Villages in Wadowice County